Thomas Hampton may refer to:

Tom Hampton (born 1965), American musician
Thomas Hampton (cricketer) (born 1990), English cricketer
Thomas de Hampton, MP for Hampshire (UK Parliament constituency)